Kubiyazy (Qubıyaź) is a rural locality (a selo) and the administrative center of Kubiyazovsky Selsoviet, Askinsky District, Bashkortostan, Russia. The population was 1,212 as of 2010. There are 20 streets.

Geography 
Kubiyazy is located 14 km east of Askino (the district's administrative centre) by road. Utyashino is the nearest rural locality.

References 

Rural localities in Askinsky District